George Baer may refer to:

 George Frederick Baer (1842–1914), American lawyer and railroad president
 George Baer, Jr. (1763–1834), United States Representative from Maryland
 George A. Baer (1903–1994), German/Swiss/American bookbinder